Arnold van den Bergh (20 January 1886 ‒ 28 October 1950) was a Dutch legal notary based in Amsterdam. He was a well-known and high-profile lawyer, one of six Jewish notaries operating in Amsterdam.  Van den Bergh contributed to the field of social work in the Netherlands, and was widely known in Amsterdam outside of the Jewish community.

In 1886, van den Bergh was born in the locality of Oss. By 1922, van den Bergh was already working as a junior notary and living in Amsterdam.  

The Judenrat was a council of Jewish citizens appointed by occupying Nazi Germany in an area with a large Jewish population, with members typically coerced (often with threats of violence against family members) into collaborating with the Nazi regime.

In 1935, Arnold van den Bergh auctioned the listed "" ("House on three canals") building—used from 1936 onwards for August Aimé Balkema's bookshop.

, Bergh was chair of the committee for the House of unemployed young Jewish, in Amsterdam.

In July 1940, he was the lawyer handling the sale of the Jacques Goudstikker art-collection to art dealer Alois Miedl for the benefit of Hermann Göring.  Van den Bergh subsequently wrote to Goudstikker's wife, Dési von Halban, informing her the sale had occurred "in order to avoid great unpleasantness".  In October 1940 van den Bergh was appointed as liquidator of the former  Goudstikker company, and indicated that the transactions had been made voluntarily.  As Nazi plunder, part of the collection would subsequently be returned by the Dutch government in the 2006 Goudstikker restitution of 202 paintings following recommendations of the Restitutions Committee.

The Van den Bergh family eventually lost their safe status and became eligible for arrest and deportation. In around October 1943 Arnold van den Bergh and his wife Auguste Kan went into hiding in Laren, their older twin daughters Emma and Esther to Noord-Scharwoude, and the third-daughter Anne-Marie to Sprundel (with some months spent in Breda).

Other founding members included  and Jacob van Amerongen. Arnold van den Bergh was one of five members called before the Jewish Honour Council. On 10 June 1948 Van den Bergh was displaced on the board of JMW by a vote.

He died of throat cancer in 1950 while in London.

A study published as a book in 2022 suggested that Van den Bergh may have indirectly betrayed those living in the secret annex of the Anne Frank House, inhabited by Anne Frank and others, in order to save his own family.  According to the book, van den Bergh in his capacity as a member of the Jewish Council of Amsterdam would have had a list of Jews hiding in Amsterdam and could have turned over the list to the occupying Nazis in order to save his family.  However, Professor Johannes Houwink ten Cate of the University of Amsterdam noted that Van den Bergh was also in hiding around the time of the raid on 4 August 1944.  The conclusion was subsequently challenged on the basis that The Jewish Council of Amsterdam had no lists of hiding Jews.  His family members threatened a lawsuit and started a foundation. The publishing house apologized and took the book out of circulation.

References

Further reading

 
 
 

1886 births
1950 deaths
Dutch collaborators with Nazi Germany
Jewish Council of Amsterdam
Dutch Jews
Deaths from throat cancer
Deaths from cancer in England
20th-century Dutch lawyers